Conlin's Furniture is a regional furniture chain of 16 stores, located in five  US states. The chain has stores in North and South Dakota, Montana, Wyoming, and Minnesota. Conlin's is headquartered in Billings, Montana, and its main distribution center is located in Bismarck, North Dakota. The company's CEO is Lollie Ray.

History

The first Conlin's Furniture store opened in Williston, North Dakota in 1937. Shortly thereafter, company co-founder Edward Conlin purchased all shares of the company and began expanding.

In 2004, the company opened a new store in the Gateway Fashion Mall in Bismarck, North Dakota, bringing the total number of Conlin stores to 18.

During the 2008 Great Recession, Conlin's closed its Sioux Falls store, citing "reduced customer traffic" and reducing the total number of stores to  16, located in South Dakota, North Dakota, Minnesota, Montana and Wyoming.

Selection
As do most furniture stores, a typical Conlin's store offers furniture from all room groups, including living room, bedroom, and dining room. Conlin's features a wide array of national brands, including La-Z-Boy, Broyhill, Sealy, Simmons, and A-America.

References

External links
 

Companies based in North Dakota
Companies based in Williston
Williams County, North Dakota
Companies based in Montana
Billings, Montana
Furniture retailers of the United States
Buildings and structures in Bismarck, North Dakota
American companies established in 1937
Retail companies established in 1937
1937 establishments in North Dakota